WDLA-FM (92.1 MHz) is a radio station broadcasting a country music format. Licensed to Walton, New York, United States, the station is owned by Townsquare Media.

References

External links

DLA-FM
Townsquare Media radio stations